Kurkino is an urban locality (an urban-type settlement) in Kurkinsky District of Tula Oblast, Russia. Population:

References

Urban-type settlements in Tula Oblast